Wartet is a village of Wallonia and a part of the district of Marche-les-Dames in the city of Namur, located in the province of Namur, Belgium.

Wartet is located on the heights near the Meuse while Marche-Les-Dames extends itself in a valley near a river stream La Gelbressée and the Meuse.

History 
The village has a classified castle-farm (Château-ferme de Wartet) located along a street known as Rue de Bayet.

References

External links
 

Populated places in Namur (province)